The battle of Serres took place in 1196 near the town of Serres in contemporary Greece between the armies of the Bulgarian and the Byzantine Empire. The result was Bulgarian victory.

Origins of the conflict 

After the beginning of the anti-Byzantine rebellion in 1185 and especially after the victory at Tryavna the Bulgarians firmly took the initiative of the war. As a result of their efforts, the Bulgarians started capturing regions of Thrace and Macedonia from Byzantines; the Bulgarian army used their strongholds to the north of the Balkan mountains and the Danube river as bases for the war.

Between 1190 and 1195 many towns to the south and south-west were seized. During his preparation for a third campaign against Bulgaria, the Byzantine Emperor Isaac II Angelos was dethroned by his brother Alexios III Angelos who offered peace to the Bulgarian Emperor. Ivan Asen I demanded the return of all Bulgarian lands, which he knew it was impossible for the Byzantines to accept, and continued the struggle.

The battle 

In the same year, the Bulgarian army advanced deep to the south-west and reached the vicinity of Serres taking many fortresses on its way. During the winter, the Bulgarians retreated to the north but in the next year reappeared and defeated a Byzantine army under the sebastokrator Isaac near the town. In the course of the battle, the Byzantine cavalry was surrounded, suffering heavy casualties, and their commander was captured.

Aftermath 
Instead of a triumphal return, the way back to the Bulgarian capital ended tragically. Slightly before reaching Tarnovo, Ivan Asen I was murdered by his cousin Ivanko, who had been bribed by the Byzantines. Still, their attempts to stop the Bulgarians failed: Ivanko could not take the throne and had to flee to Byzantium. The Bulgarians advanced further during the reign of Kaloyan (r. 1197–1207).

References

1196 in Europe
1190s in the Byzantine Empire
12th century in Bulgaria
Battles involving the Second Bulgarian Empire
Serres
Serres 1196
Medieval Macedonia
Conflicts in 1196
History of Serres